Cornwall Airport may refer to:

 Cornwall Regional Airport, Canada
 Newquay Airport, also known as Cornwall Airport Newquay, England